Several ships of the French navy have borne the name Blonde:
She was wrecked in 1782.
, launched in 1781, that  and  captured in 1793; she was taken into service as HMS Blonde. She was sold in 1794  and became a whaling ship that a French privateer captured in 1796.

French Navy ship names